During World War II, the United States Army Air Forces (USAAF) established numerous airfields in North Carolina for antisubmarine defense in the Atlantic Ocean and for training pilots and aircrews of USAAF fighters and bombers.

Most of these airfields were under the command of Third Air Force or the Army Air Forces Training Command (AAFTC) (A predecessor of the current-day United States Air Force Air Education and Training Command).  However the other USAAF support commands (Air Technical Service Command (ATSC); Air Transport Command (ATC) or Troop Carrier Command) commanded a significant number of airfields in a support roles.

It is still possible to find remnants of these wartime airfields. Many were converted into municipal airports, some were returned to agriculture and several were retained as United States Air Force installations and were front-line bases during the Cold War. Hundreds of the temporary buildings that were used survive today, and are being used for other purposes.

Major Airfields 

Troop Carrier Command
 Pope Field, Fort Bragg, Fayetteville
 92d Army Air Force Base Unit (I TCC)
 Was: Pope Air Force Base
 Now:  Pope Field
 Laurinburg-Maxton Army Air Base, Maxton
 392d Army Air Force Base Unit
 Glider training facility

Third Air Force
 Morris Field, Charlotte
 30th Army Air Force Base Unit
 Now: Charlotte Douglas International Airport and
 Now:  Charlotte Air National Guard Base
 Seymour Johnson Field, Goldsboro
 333d Army Air Force Base Unit
 Now:  Seymour Johnson Air Force Base
 Bluethenthal Field, Wilmington
 423d Army Air Force Base Unit
 Now: Wilmington International Airport

Army Air Force Training CommandAAF Southeast Training Center
 Asheville-Hendersonville AAF, Hendersonville
 Joint Use USAAF/Contract Flying School
 Also used by United States Navy
 Lindley Field/Greensboro-High Point MAP, Greensboro
 Joint Use Civil Airport/USAAF/United States Navy
 Winston-Salem Airport, Winston-Salem
 Joint Use Civil Airport/USAAF/United States Navy

Air Technical Service Command
 Raleigh-Durham AAF, Raleigh

References
 Maurer, Maurer (1983). Air Force Combat Units Of World War II. Maxwell AFB, Alabama: Office of Air Force History. .
 Ravenstein, Charles A. (1984). Air Force Combat Wings Lineage and Honors Histories 1947-1977. Maxwell AFB, Alabama: Office of Air Force History. .
 Thole, Lou (1999), Forgotten Fields of America : World War II Bases and Training, Then and Now - Vol. 2.  Pictorial Histories Pub . 
 Military Airfields in World War II - North Carolina

External links

 01
World War II
Airfields of the United States Army Air Forces in the United States by state
United States World War II army airfields